Pat Price may refer to:

Pat Price (ice hockey) (born 1955), Canadian ice hockey player
Pat Price (remote viewer)

See also
Patrick Price (disambiguation)